Jeevan J. Kang is an Indian comic book artist and writer.

Work
He was responsible for the artwork and script of the comic Spider-Man: India, and was signed on by Virgin Comics to create art for their Indian comics. He is also the co creator of The Legend of Hanuman - an Indian  animated Epic fantasy television series

Publications
His comic work includes:

The Sadhu (with Gotham Chopra, Virgin Comics, 2006)
Seven Brothers (with Garth Ennis, based on a concept by John Woo, 5-issue mini-series, Virgin Comics, 2006)

See also
Indian comics

References

Year of birth missing (living people)
Living people
Indian comics artists